Mark Richard Acres (born November 15, 1962) is an American former professional basketball player who spent most of his career in the National Basketball Association (NBA). He was a 6'11",  power forward/center.

Acres attended Oral Roberts University, where he played for his father Dick, and was drafted in the second round of the 1985 NBA draft by the Dallas Mavericks. He was a part of the Orlando Magic's first year expansion team.

NBA career statistics

Regular season 

|-
| align="left" | 1987–88
| align="left" | Boston
| 79 || 5 || 14.6 || .532 || .000 || .640 || 3.4 || .5 || .4 || .3 || 3.6 
|-
| align="left" | 1988–89
| align="left" | Boston
| 62 || 0 || 10.2 || .482 || 1.000 || .542 || 2.4 || .3 || .3 || .1 || 2.2
|-
| align="left" | 1989–90
| align="left" | Orlando
| 80 || 50 || 21.1 || .484 || .750 || .692 || 5.4 || .8 || .5 || .3 || 4.5
|-
| align="left" | 1990–91
| align="left" | Orlando
| 68 || 0 || 19.3 || .509 || .333 || .653 || 5.3 || .4 || .4 || .4 || 4.2
|-
| align="left" | 1991–92
| align="left" | Orlando
| 68 || 6 || 13.6 || .517 || .333 || .761 || 3.7 || .3 || .4 || .2 || 3.1
|-
| align="left" | 1992–93
| align="left" | Houston
| 6 || 0 || 3.8 || .222 || .500 || .500 || 1.0 || .0 || .0 || .0 || 1.0
|-
| align="left" | 1992–93
| align="left" | Washington
| 12 || 7 || 20.5 || .600 || .000 || .714 || 5.1 || .4 || .3 || .5 || 4.8
|-
| align="left" | Career
| align="left" | 
| 375 || 68 || 16.0 || .506 || .538 || .665 || 4.1 || .5 || .4 || .3 || 3.6
|}

Playoffs 

|-
| align="left" | 1987–88
| align="left" | Boston
| 17 || – || 9.3 || .538 || .000 || .500 || 2.1 || .1 || .1 || .1 || 2.2
|-
| align="left" | 1988–89
| align="left" | Boston
| 2 || – || 1.0 || .000 || .000 || .000 || .5 || .0 || .0 || .0 || .0
|-
| align="left" | Career
| align="left" | 
| 19 || – || 8.4 || .519 || .000 || .500 || 1.9 || .1 || .1 || .1 || 1.9
|}

References

See also 
 List of NCAA Division I men's basketball players with 2000 points and 1000 rebounds

1962 births
Living people
American expatriate basketball people in France
American expatriate basketball people in Italy
American expatriate basketball people in Portugal
American men's basketball players
Basketball players from Inglewood, California
Boston Celtics players
Centers (basketball)
Dallas Mavericks draft picks
Houston Rockets players
McDonald's High School All-Americans
Oral Roberts Golden Eagles men's basketball players
Orlando Magic expansion draft picks
Orlando Magic players
Pallacanestro Varese players
Parade High School All-Americans (boys' basketball)
Power forwards (basketball)
S.L. Benfica basketball players
Washington Bullets players